New Heritage Theatre Group (NHTG) is the oldest Black nonprofit theater company in New York City, established in 1964. Through its multiple divisions: IMPACT Repertory Theatre, The Roger Furman Reading Series, and New Heritage Films, New Heritage gives training, exposure, and experience to new and emerging artists, playwrights, directors and technicians of color. New Heritage was founded by the late Roger Furman and is currently headed by Executive Producer Voza Rivers and Executive Artistic Director Jamal Joseph. NHTG presentations capture the historical, social, and political experiences of Black and Latino descendants in America and abroad.

Since its founding in 1964, the New Heritage Theatre Group has produced and co-presented thousands of theatrical, film, concert, and music productions including The Harlem Shakespeare Festival, presented in collaboration with Take Wing And Soar Productions, to showcase classically trained actors of color;  Tony-nominated Asinamali!; the Tony and GRAMMY-nominated Broadway musical Sarafina!; the Obie award-winning Woza Albert!; The Huey P. Newton Story and Township Fever.

Early history
NHTG was established in 1964 as the New Heritage Repertory Theatre (NHRT) by the late Roger Furman, a playwright, director, actor, and lecturer. Furman's career in Harlem began at the American Negro Theater in the 1940s. He began New Heritage Repertory Theater (NHRT) in 1964 as a street theater while employed with HARYOU-ACT, a federally financed anti-poverty program in Harlem. New Heritage Repertory Theatre, under Furman's leadership, produced over 35 plays including Strivers Row written by Abram Hill, co-founder of the American Negro Theatre. Furman also directed the Three Penny Opera featuring famed actress Geraldine Fitzgerald.

Roger Furman was born on March 22, 1924, in New Jersey and studied theatre arts at the Dramatic Workshop of the New School for Social Research under Erwin Piscator. Furman worked as an apprentice under Rafael Ríos Rey at the National Theatre of Puerto Rico and was a former student at the American Negro Theatre (ANT) with Sidney Potier,  Clarice Taylor, Harry Belafonte, Ruby Dee and, Gertrude Jeannette. Furman was the youngest person at the American Negro Theatre commissioned to design a set for Tin Top Valley, starring Fred O'Neil, produced by American Negro Theatre.  Furman's trademark was imaginative headgear and he believed in Harlem as a fertile theatrical seedbed. In addition to his acting and directing chores, Furman taught courses on the History of Black Drama at New York University, Rutgers, and Hartford University and was a co-founder of the Black Theater Alliance, an organization of performance groups.

His directing chores include Bertolt Brecht's Three Penny Opera, Wine In The Wilderness (1969) and, Mojo: A Black Love Story (1970) by Alice Childress. Furman wrote and directed the critically acclaimed play The Long Black Block (1972) with music by Jackie McClean and co-authored and directed Fat Tuesday with Dee Robinson. Roger Furman edited the 35th-anniversary edition of the New York Times Bestseller The Black Book, an encyclopedic look at the black experience in America from 1619 through the 1940s. Furman's work as a set designer and the founder of New Heritage Theatre Group is cited in Warren Hoffman's The Great White Way: Race and the Broadway Musical.

Additional directing work by Furman includes the award-winning Montezuma's Revenge, Harlem's classic On Strivers Row (1949), A Day of Absent, Hip, Black and Angry (1967), The Gimmick (1968), To Kill a Devil, Man In The Family, Harlem Heyday, Another Shade of Harlem, No Snakes In The Grass, Monseigneur Baptiste The Con Man and Fun in Games.

New Heritage Repertory Theatre was awarded a training program grant from Columbia University School of Theatre to teach young Black and Puerto Ricans the technical aspects of theatre. In 1973, Roger Furman was a recipient of the AUDELCO Board of Directors Awards and was nominated for best director in 1975 for Fat Tuesday. His New Heritage Repertory Theatre was honored by Fibonacci Inc. for its contribution to the rich cultural life of the Harlem community.

New Leadership 

In 1983 upon Furman's death, Voza Rivers, a co-founding member of NHTG (1964) and award-winning music and theatre producer, took over the company and reorganized under the name New Heritage Theatre Group (NHTG).  Rivers is an accomplished theatre, music, film and, events producer and is recognized as one of the country’s leading African American theatre producers. Since 1983, under the leadership of Voza Rivers, NHTG presents entertaining, informative theatrical productions, staged readings and, documentary shorts and films, the mission was expanded to provide training, experience, and international exposure to veteran and emerging artists.

Divisions 

IMPACT Repertory Theatre, the youth division of New Heritage Theatre Group, was established in 1997 by Jamal Joseph, a U.S. writer, director, producer, poet, activist, and educator to ensure that the legacy of the company lives on. Since its founding, IMPACT has featured over 1000 youth between the ages of 12 to 19 with original staged performances in front of live audiences totaling over 100,000. 

IMPACT uses the performing arts and the dynamics of leadership training to inspire and empower youth through workshops, leadership programs, and performance opportunities rooted in creative self-expression, anchored by a commitment to safe space, outstanding effort, and service to the community. IMPACT’S ongoing performance program, creative labs, and twelve-week intensive artist and activist training programs are tuition-free. Several hundred IMPACT alumnae have attended or are currently enrolled in college and graduate schools that include top-tier historically black colleges and universities and IVEY league institutions across the United States. 

IMPACT was OSCAR and GRAMMY-nominated for their song Raise It Up from the movie August Rush starring Robin Williams.  In December 2014, IMPACT performed a 20-minute piece in front of the Duke and Duchess of Cambridge alongside youth performers from youth empowerment organizations The Door and the CityKids Foundation.

IMPACT has also appeared in the films Disappearing Acts and Hughes' Dreams Harlem (2002). Live performances include People Magazines Next Great Artists Showcase, the Apollo, Lincoln Center, the Public Theater, The United Nations, Major League Soccer’s Tribute to Pele. IMPACT has been featured in several television programs including ABC, CBS, NBC.

The Roger Furman Reading Series works with emerging and established playwrights on early drafts of their scripts to produce their work in front of a live audience. The series also provides a vehicle for celebrity artists associated with the company to return and perform in Harlem. Highlights of the Roger Furman Reading Series include producing plays for award-winning actors, playwright and author Daniel Beaty and, playwright and radio host Esther Armah.

In 2015 Voza Rivers and New Heritage Theatre Group partnered with MIST Harlem to present the staged reading series Bold New Voices, Past, Present and Future. The Bold New Voices series presented and created stories about people of color. Programs encompassed African American, Asian, Hispanic and, the African Diaspora cultural communities featuring music, film, drama, talk-backs, symposiums, play-writing, poetry, fiction workshops and more

New Heritage Films & Harlemwood Film Festival explores issues of the African diaspora through film. Annually, New Heritage Films features documentaries and films in the Harlem community from emerging and established filmmakers through the Harlemwood Film Festival. Productions include Hughes' Dream Harlem (2002), Savoy King (2012), A-Alike (2003) and Chapter and Verse (2015).

A partial listing of films produced by New Heritage Films includes the award-winning Hughes' Dream Harlem (2002),  Sonia Sanchez: Shake Loose Memories (2011) Percy Sutton: A Man for All Seasons, Da Zone, Drive By: A Love Story (1997), The Black New Yorkers, Burning Sands, The 95th Anniversary of the National Urban League, the 110th Anniversary of The Greater Harlem Chamber of Commerce, Harlem is...Music, Harlem is...Theater, and Harlem is... Gospel documentaries.

International Programming 

NHTG seeks to bring attention to works by international writers, directors, and artists who lack exposure in the United States.

NHTG and Japan Connection 

New Heritage Theatre Group has a long-standing historical relationship with Japan. Collaborations have resulted in then-Japanese Crown Prince Akihito's 1987 visit to Harlem and dozens of concerts in Japan and New York featuring Japanese and African American entertainers. New Heritage and its collaborating partners produce benefit concerts, theatrical productions, and exhibitions in partnership with the Japan Chamber of Commerce, The Japan Society, and The Consulate General of Japan in support of breaking down barriers of cultural misunderstanding. In 2012 New Heritage Theatre Group produced the 100th anniversary of the Sakura Cherry Blossom Festival in Harlem.

NHTG and South African Connection 
New Heritage Theatre Groups connection to South African theatre began in 1984 when Rivers and his production team Andre Robinson, Phyllis Yvonne Stickney, and his South African producing team Duma Ndlovu and Mbongeni Ngema transferred South African play Woza Albert!, a play that opened at Johannesburg's Market Theater and toured in Europe and America as the most successful play to come out of South Africa to Harlem's New Heritage Theatre. The successful impact of Striver's Row inspired Rivers to look beyond the African American experience and reach across the world to introduce Harlem to the works of Black South African playwrights and actors, creating an opportunity to bring lessons from the South African Apartheid to the Harlem community. NHTG produced a series of plays in the 1980s — including Woza Albert(1985)!, Asinamli! (1986) and Sarafina! (1987) that educated Harlemites about the apartheid struggle. Asinimali, a play about the celebration of resistance, opened in 1986 at Roger Furman's New Heritage Repertory Theatre (now known as New Heritage Theatre Group) just two weeks after an attack by an armed mob, killing the shows local promoter as a reaction to the plays political stance.

In 2014 New Heritage Theatre Group was represented on a panel at the Apollo Theatre along with former Mayor David Dinkins, actor and activist Harry Belafonte, Black Star News publisher Milton Allimadi, National Black Theatre CEO Sade Lythcott, South African Consul General George Monyemangene that was part of a four-day festival that highlighted Harlem's longstanding relationship with South Africa, also celebrating the 20th anniversary of Nelson Mandela's historic inauguration as South Africa's first black president.

NHTG and Cuba Connection 

In 2015, Executive Producer and Founding Member of New Heritage Theatre Group Voza Rivers joined U.S. representatives on a state trade mission to Cuba. The delegation met with senior officials of the Cuban government on trade, business, and tourism to continue the process of normalization and cultural exchange between Harlem, the U.S.A, and Havana, Cuba.

The first annual Harlem/Havana Music and Cultural Festival was launched in the summer of 2016, during the 42nd anniversary of the HARLEMWEEK Festival at The Cathedral Church of St.John Divine. The annual Harlem/Havana Music and Cultural Festival celebrates the ongoing harmonious relationship between the two countries with a lineup of Afro-Cuban jazz, dance performances, workshops, photography installations, Cuban cuisine, and art exhibitions.

New Heritage Theatre Group has also presented productions featuring Oyu Oro Afro-Cuban Dance company. Oyo Oro is committed to the preservation of Afro-Cuban folklore, as well as the encouragement of cross-cultural understanding of dance and music.

Collaborations

New Heritage Theatre Group and Harlem Arts Alliance 

New Heritage Theatre Group partners and collaborates with many arts and culture organizations including Harlem Arts Alliance, a not-for-profit membership-based arts advocacy organization, founded in 2001. Harlem Arts Alliance is committed to its mission of nurturing the artistic growth of artists and the organizational development of arts organizations based in Harlem and surrounding communities. Harlem Arts Alliance (HAA) bridges gaps between artists and major arts institutions, amplifying the unique voices of its member artists and expanding the conversations surrounding their work through workshops, showcases, and presentation programs featuring the work of its members. New Heritage Theatre Group co-produces a variety of programming in partnership with Harlem Arts Alliance including the Kwanzaa Artisan Marketplace in partnership with the American Museum of Natural History, The 4 Pillar Summer Arts Program, and Deconstructing Harlem's Black Theaters which is a town hall discussion in partnership with Coalitions of Theaters of Color and Harlem Hospital.

Harlem Arts Alliance provides a critical set of programs and services to its members which also includes performance and exhibition opportunities, professional and creative development workshops, Harlem Arts Advocacy Week, grants to artists and art organizations, and monthly meetings designed for information exchange and networking.

New Heritage Theatre Group and Shades of Truth Theatre 

Since 2003, Shades of Truth Theatre in collaboration with Voza Rivers and New Heritage Theatre Group has produced various plays regarding the Black experience including Celeste Bedford Walker’s Black Wall Street and Camp Logan. Together they have also presented Jeff Stetson’s The Meeting at venues throughout the Tri-State area and across the United States. A partial listing of additional co-productions include The Day Harlem Saved Dr. King and Black Wall Street: Ten Stories High, a series of short plays that chronicle the rise and fall of successful Black Towns that were established during and post-reconstruction.

New Heritage Theatre Group and Take Wing and Soar Productions, Inc. 

Take Wing And Soar Productions, Inc. is a women-led 501©3 theatre company dedicated to supporting women, youth, and classically trained actors of color, founded by Debra Ann Byrd. 
Take Wing And Soar Productions, in partnership with New Heritage Theatre Group, have presented multiple collaborations including a main-stage production of Oscar Wilde's The Important of Being Earnest  (2013), directed by Kevin Connell. 

In the summer of 2013, the  Harlem Shakespeare Festival was launched by Take Wing and Soar Productions and New Heritage Theatre Group. The annual Festival's mission is to foster understanding and unity in the arts by producing special events and plays with diverse casts and to create center stage opportunities for classically trained actors of color. Productions include the all-female, multi-racial mainstage production of Othello: The Moor of Venice  (2019).

Community partners 

• City College Aaron Davis Hall
• Apollo Theatre Foundation
• Columbia University Arts Initiative
• Columbia University School of the Arts
• Community Works
• El Museo Del Barrio
• Frank Silvera's Writers Workshop
• Greater Harlem Chamber of Commerce
• Harbor Conservatory for the Performing Arts
• Harlem Arts Alliance
• Harlem Jazz and Music Festival
• Harlem Week
• Museum of the City of New York
• National Black Sports and Entertainment Hall of Fame
• New Federal Theatre
• The National Museum of Catholic Arts
• Schomburg Center for Research in Black Culture
• Tupac Amaru Shakur Center for The Arts

Production Highlights (partial listing) 
This list is a partial listing of productions New Heritage Theatre Group has produced or co-produced in conjunction with one or more of its collaborating partners.

Theatrical Productions 
Three Shades of Harlem (1964)
Ruby Dee (1964)
Three Shades of Harlem (1964)
Hip, Black and Angry (1967)
Another Shade of Harlem (1968)
To Kill a Devil (1968)
Wine in the Wilderness (1971)
Madame Odum (1972)
The Long Black Block (1972, 1975, 1995)
Geraldine Fitzgerald's Three Penny Opera (1972)
Mama Odun (1973)
On Strivers Row (1974, 1984)
Fat Tuesday (1975)
Kingdom and the Ceremony (1977)
Four O'Clock on a Rainy Afternoon (1978)
The Legend of Deadwood Dick (1979)
Roshamon (1979)
Monsieur Baptiste the Con Man (1981)
Clinton: An Urban Fairytale (1984)
Casualties and Lesson Plans (1984)
Zora (1984)
Janin (1984)
Woza Albert! (1984)
When Chickens Come Home to Roost (1984)
The Gimmick (1986)
Asinimali! (1986)
Sarafina! (1987) 
Township Fever! (1990)
The Third Rhythm (1990)
An Aftertaste of Sherry (1993)
Madame CJ Walker (1995)
The Long Black Block (1995)
Goddess City (1996)
Spiritual Journey (1997)Five Stops on a Merry Go Round (2001)Woza Albert! (2004)Tierno Bokar (2005)Winterkill (2005)Camp Logan (2006)Esther Armah: Can I Be Me? (2007)Martin, Malcolm and, Medgar (2008)Formerly Known as Sarah (2008)The Session (2008)Daniel Beaty: Resurrection (2008)Camp Logan (2008)Esther Armah: Forgive Me (2008)The Session (2008)The Meeting (2009)Daniel Beaty: Tearing Down the Walls (2011)When Chickens Come Home to Roost (2011)Lorey Hayes: Haiti's Children of God (2011)Massinissa (2011)Esther Armah: Savior (2011)The Savoy King (2012)Daniel Beaty:  Mr. Joy (2012)The Fannie Lou Hamer Story (2012)Circumstances (2012)Daniel Beaty: Through the Night (2012)Love to All Lorraine (2012)Daniel Beaty: Emergency (2012)Coriolanus: An African WarriorAdam (2012, 2013)The Importance of Being Earnest (2013)Harlem Shakespeare Festival (2013)Benefits (2013)The Firefighters (2014)IMPACT: Peace Warriors (2014)Sable Series (2014)Lissabon (2014)Whistle in Mississippi (2014)The People vs. Clarendon County (2014)The Kitchen (2014)Inamori Project:  Prayer, Love and Peace (2012, 2014)Annual Harlem Shakespeare Festival (2013, 2014)			Black Wall Street (2014)The Dawn of the Rooster (2015)A Double Encore Production (2015)Anne and Emmett (2015)Othello: The Moor of Venice (2015)Gravity of Love* (2017)Holding On (2012-2019)Urge to Purge (2018)March On (2018)Unheard Noted (2018)Barbra Jordan (2018)Father's Day (2018)Sable Series (2018)Mable Madness(2018)Harlem Saved a King" (2018)
Tales of Women (2018)
Black Turns Gold (2018
The Meeting (2012-2018)
Truebone(2016-2019)
The Fannie Lou Hammer Story: Sick and Tired of Being Sick and Tired (2018-2019)
Reading of FOUNDATION (2019)
One Last Night Before Sempiternity (2019)
Fifi Dalla The African Pearl (2019)
Holding On (2019)
My Harlem 'Tis of Thee (2019)
It Can't Happen Here (2020)
Turning 15 On The Road To Freedom(2020)
Casting the Vote (2020)
The Fannie Lou Hammer Story Live on Facebook and Instagram (2020)
The Importance of Being Earnest (2020)
It is Africa (2020)

Roger Furman Reading Series 
Living Doll (1990)
Crimen Injuria (1990)
Friends (1991)
The Race to Olduvai
Fathers and Mothers (1991)
Union (1991)
Bailey's Café (1991-1996)
Les Femme Noires (1994)
A Way out of No Way (1995)
Sarah's Jukebox (1996)
On My Birthday (1996)
Eldridge Cleaver Memorial
Frankie Cracker Memorial (2000)
Five Stops on a Merry Go Round (2001)
Nothin' But the Truth (2003)
Habit Forms (2003)
Punching at the Sun (2004)
Nobody Knew Who They Was (2004)
Pass Perfect (2004)
A Song for You... (2006)
Are You Dead Yet? (2006)
Weekend Pass (2006)
Deliver the Dance (2006)
Paradise Lost (2006)
Malcolm, Martin, Medgar (2006)
Your God's Not Coming (2007)
Long Black Block (2007)
Almost September (2008)
The Diva and the Rapper (2008)
The Diva and the Rapper II (2009)
A Paradise Lost (2009)
Strama Baby (2009)
Esther Armah: Entitled? (2009)
The Haitians (2010)
Power Play (2011, 2012, 2013)
Portrait of an Earl (2011) 
Esther Armah: Savior (2011)
Vito Marcantonio (2011)
A Few Brave Men (2012)
Bill Harris: BLUES & JAZZ Plays, Poems (2012)
Othello: The Moore of Venice (2013)
Short Eyes (2013)
Freedom Summer (2014)
Julius Caesar (2015)
The Chosen Few (2015)
The Park Plays (2015)
The Sable Series: The History of Black Shakespearean Actors (2015)

Concert Productions 
Let The Music Say Amen (1993)
Roger Furman's 30th Anniversary Celebration (1994) 
3 Guys Named Joe (1997)
TriHarLenium Continues (2000)
Higher Ground:  Expression In Dance and Song (2001)
IMPACT:  6th Anniversary (2002)
Ken Hicks:  Sings Avanti (2005)
 Jazz for Peace (2005)
Harlem Ladies in Music (2006)
Write On Rosie (2006)
Ebony Stages A Celebration of Contemporary Black Theater, American Museum of Natural History (2006)
Lee Olive Tucker, Museum of the City of New York (2006)
Craig Harris' God's Trombones (2006) 
Kwanzaa Spirit,American Museum of Natural History (2006)
Kwanzaa Celebration, American Museum of Natural History (2007)
Late Great Ladies of Blues and Jazz (2007)
IMPACT 10th Anniversary Gala and Screening of August Rush (2007)
Voices for Peace (2007)
Unheard Notes (2007)
It's Always You, Lainie Cooke (2007)
Kwanzaa, American Museum of Natural History (2008)
Do Enka (2008)
Berta's Jam (2008)
Do Wop Love (2008)
Pass the Torch Blues Tap and Swing (2008)
All of Me, Lainie Cooke (2009)
Artspeak with Tsidii (2009)
Jazz for Peace (2009)
IMPACT nominated for Academy Award for the song "Raise it Up", on the August Rush Soundtrack (2008)
IMPACT: Raise it Up"  at 2008 Oscar Award Ceremony (2008)
IMPACT: Raise it Up at the Apollo Theater (2008)
Wild Women Don't Have the Blues (2009)
IMPACT Vibe: Concert (2009)
IMPACT:  Raise It Up (2009)
IMPACT: I Live (2010)
It's Always You featuring Lainie Cooke (2010)
The Sakura Cherry Blossom Festival (2010)
Harlem 4 Japan Benefit Concert (2010)
Message Behind the Music with Obediah Wright (2010)
Do Enka Concert (2010)
Kwanzaa 2010:  The Legacy Continues with McCollough Invaders, and Kochegena (2010)
Nothin' But the Blues (2010)
The Sakura Cherry Blossom Festival (2010)
Berta's Jam II (2011)
IMPACT:  Dream Keepers (2011)
Saluting our Jazz Elders with Joey Morant and New Amsterdam Music Association and Randy Weston (2011)
Speaking in Rhythm featuring IMPACT (2011)
Removing the Bars (2012)
Voices from Japan (2012)
Do Enka II (2012)
In the Spirit What's Your Groove (2012)	
IMPACT Repertory Theatre 15th Anniversary Celebration (2012)					
R&B & Blues:  IMPACT Legacy, Kwame & The Uptown Shakedown (2012)
First Fruits of the Harvest Kwanzaa Celebration featuring B Smith Restoration Theatre (2012)
African American Musical Mosaic: First Corinthian Baptist Church Choir, Sandra Reeves Phillips, IMPACT with Darryl "DMC" McDaniels
Stories We Tell:  A Tribute to Storytellers (2012)
Global Weekends: 35th Anniversary Celebration Kwanzaa at the American Museum of Natural History (2013)
Focus on Peace: Art Exhibition and Taiko Japanese Drummers (2014)
International Jazz Festival (2015)
Tribute to Ben E King (December 2015)
Lainie Cooke in Concert (2018)
Musical Tribute to Hugh Masakela (2019)
Biko Rising (2019)
More or Less I am (2019)
Harlem Celebrates Cuba and its Music (2019)
It is Africa (2020)

Film Productions and Events 
Hughes' Dreams Harlem (Film) (2002)
International Black Panther Film Festival (2003)
It's Always You: Lainie Cooke (2007, 2010)
A Celebration of the Life and work of Lorraine Hansberry (2010)
Harlem is… Gospel, Documentary (2011)
Harlem is… Music, Documentary (2011)
Harlem is… Theater, Documentary (2011)
Black Panther Film Festival (2011)
R&B & Blues: IMPACT Legacy, Kwame & The Uptown Shakedown (2012)
"Tilai" : Harlemwood Film Festival (2012)
Savoy King (2012)
Screening, Premiere or ESPN 30 for 20 Series One Night in Vegas (2012)
Elza, Screening (2012)
We Remember Sassy with Mzuri Moyo (2013)
Focus on Peace: Art Exhibition and Taiko Japanese Drummers (2013)
"Anom Du Christ"	Harlemwood Film Festival (2013)
Yuri Kochiyama Memorial (2014)
Finding Fela, Screening (2014)
Twenty Feet From Stardom, Screening (2014)
Chapter & Verse (2015)
SummerStage Harlem (2019)
True See (2019)

Workshops 
Del Caribe Soy (2018-2019)

References

1964 establishments in New York City
Theatre companies in New York City
Harlem